Daughters, also known as Our Mother's Murder  is a 1997 made-for-TV drama film directed by Bill L. Norton, and stars Holly Marie Combs and Sarah Chalke who play Alex and Annie, the two eldest daughters of the main character Anne.

A possible movie adaptation of the true crime story was in talks since 1994, though Alex and Annie Morrell agreed only years later. Whereas they had no involvement in the production, and thought the film was overly dramatic, they supported the message and hoped that Daughters could help any victims of domestic violence.

Plot
In Spring 1989, sisters Alex and Anne Morrell finish prep school, and return home to start college. Their mother, publishing heiress Anne Scripps, welcomes them in her New York mansion. Anne has recently divorced her husband Tony, and is still struggling with the divorce. Nonetheless, she is happy with her new boyfriend, much younger Scott Douglas, a volatile-tempered young man whom she marries only months after their first meeting.

From the start, Alex is uncertain if she should trust Scott, having heard stories about a possible violent past. When Anne announces that she will be having a baby, Scott is distrustful to notice how Alex reacts with doubt about the news. To get rid of her, he claims that he has found marijuana in Alex's bedroom. Alex denies the accusation, but Anne defends her boyfriend, who forces Alex to leave the house.

Shortly after Anne and Scott's baby, Tori's, birth in June 1990, Scott gets violent and beats up Anne for inviting Tony's family for the baby's coming out party. Alex and Annie encourage their mom to leave Scott, but Anne forgives him after a couple of months. By June 1991, she and Scott are a happy couple again. On Alex's 21st birthday, Scott lashes out at Anne again when he finds her smoking in the same room as Tori, and then throws a guest, Stacey, off the stairs. Enraged, Alex dares Scott to hit her, and the police interrupts their fight, only to have Scott lie about the situation. A similar occurrence takes place at a formal ball, where Scott pushes around Anne in front of her friends. As they leave, the fight continues in the car, and Scott eventually throws her out while speeding.

Three months later, Alex's charges against Scott have been dropped, though Anne has filed for divorce and attained a restraining order. The three women move on with their lives, until one night Annie is hit by her date, Mark, while Alex meets a new romantic interest, Jimmy Romeo, though a relationship is postponed due to her focus on her mother. Another setback occurs when Anne is informed that she will have to share custody of Tori. Deciding a reconciliation would be for the better, Anne meets with Scott and believes that he has changed his life for the better.

It turns out, soon, however, that Scott is still as violent as he used to be and threatens to make Tori disappear if she does not stop continuing legal proceedings. The police arrive at the mansion sometime later, though Anne is too scared to file charges. The following day, upon finding out that Scott is stealing her money and planning on running away with Tori, Anne asks for another restraining order. Alex and Annie move in with her again to protect their mother from Scott, and until Alex leaves for the holidays, they are happy again.

One day, Tony calls the mansion, and Scott answers. Believing that Anne will get back with Tony, he announces that the threats are over, and that something has to be done. As soon as Annie leaves, Scott gets drunk and grabs a hammer, killing Anne while she is asleep. Afterwards, he jumps to his death off the Tappan Zee Bridge, over the Hudson River in New York, though his body is found over three months later. The girls are left behind in grief over their mother. Fifteen months later, Alex prepares to marry Jimmy, and in the aftertitles, it is revealed that she gave birth to a baby daughter.

Cast
 Holly Marie Combs as Alex Morrell
 Roxanne Hart as Anne Scripps
 Sarah Chalke as Annie Morrell
 James Wilder as Scott Douglas
 Jonathan Scarfe as Jimmy Romeo
 Michael Buie as Andy Phillips
 Edgar Davis Jr. as Mark
 Stephen Fanning as Dave
 Myriam Sirois as Stacey
 Jim Thorburn as Princeton One
 Rick Ravanello as Officer Calder
 Alf Humphreys as Officer Derrick
 Ryan Michael as Tony Morrell
 Nalia Rukavina as Tory Douglas
 Bob Osborne as Roger Preston
 Colleen Winton as Suzanne Preston
 Peter Yunker as Tom
 Jane MacDougall as Barbara
 Andrew Johnston as Lawyer
 Marcus Hondro as Larry the Locksmith (as Markus Hondro)
 Anna Hagan as Judge Karmin
 Lesley Ewen as Linda Keesler
 John Dadey as Officer Garrison
 Rob Morton as Officer Tim
 Tracey Lively as Waitress
 Crystal Verge as Sylvia
 Peter Bryant as Booking Officer

External links
 
 https://web.archive.org/web/20100124123459/http://newsofhot.com/anne-scripps-douglas/

1997 films
1997 television films
1990s thriller drama films
American thriller drama films
American thriller television films
American drama television films
Films about domestic violence
Drama films based on actual events
Films set in 1989
Films set in 1990
Films set in 1991
Lifetime (TV network) films
Films directed by Bill L. Norton
1990s English-language films
1990s American films